Mipafox is a highly toxic organophosphate insecticide that can cause delayed neurotoxicity and paralysis. It is an irreversible acetylcholinesterase inhibitor that is resistant to cholinesterase reactivators.

Synthesis
Phosphoryl chloride is first reacted with isopropylamine. The resulting product is then reacted with potassium fluoride or ammonium fluoride to produce mipafox.

See also
Dimefox
Schradan

References

Acetylcholinesterase inhibitors
Organophosphate insecticides
Fluorine compounds
Isopropylamino compounds